Wikiracing is a game which the players race towards the goal of traversing from one Wikipedia page to another using only internal links. It has many different variations, described further down in the article, and names, including The Wikipedia Game, Wikipedia Maze, Wikispeedia, Wikiwars, Wikipedia Ball, Litner Ball, Wikipedia Racing, and Wikipedia Speedrunning. External websites have been created to facilitate the game.

The Seattle Times has recommended it as a good educational pastime for children and the Larchmont Gazette has said, "While I don't know any teenagers who would curl up with an encyclopedia for a good read, I hear that a lot are reading it in the process of playing the Wikipedia Game".

The Amazing Wiki Race has been an event at the TechOlympics and the Yale Freshman Olympics.

The average number of links separating any English-language Wikipedia page from the United Kingdom page is 3.67. Thus, it has been occasionally banned in the game. Other common rules such as not using the United States page increase the game's difficulty.

As of 2005, a website and game known as The Wiki Game has been created, allowing players to Wikirace against each other in a server, for more points and recognition on the server. The game achieved more recognition as Internet stars such as Game Grumps played it on their channels. There is a version on the App Store as well, in which players can do a variety of Wikirace styles from their phone.

Variations 
Wikiracing has many different variants, but the two most popular ones are:

Speed Wiki, in which participants compete to reach the finish page (previously concurred upon), within a limited time. The first to reach the final page within the time limit is thereby crowned the winner.

Click Wiki, in which participants race to reach the final page with the fewest clicks or within a certain number of clicks.

The Wikipedia Game,  detailed on Wikipedia’s Twitter page and Protocol.com, is a game where Internet users can challenge themselves to find one path from one Wikipedia article to another.

See also 
 Six degrees of separation
 Crowdsourcing
 Gamification
 Virtual volunteering
 Volunteer computing
 Wikipedia community

References

External links 
 Wikipedia's Wikirace project page
 Wikipedia's Wiki Ladders project page

Wikipedia
Online games